Irattimadhuram is a 1982 Indian Malayalam film, directed by Sreekumaran Thampi. The film stars Prem Nazir, Krishnachandran, K. R. Vijaya and Master Rajakumaran Thampi in the lead roles. The film has musical score by Shyam.

Cast
Prem Nazir as Achuthan Nair
Krishnachandran as Ramu
K. R. Vijaya as Madhavikutty
Master Rajakumaran Thampi as Ravikuttan
Master Khaja Sharif
Shanavas as Surendran
Shivaji as Balan
Sumalatha as Sangeetha
Sukumari as Kalyaniyamma
Adoor Bhasi as Thorappan Panikkar
Jagathy Sreekumar as Unnikrishnan
Balan K. Nair as K. B. Menon
P. K. Abraham as Vakkel Mahadevan
Vijayalakshmi as Mrs Panikkar
Guddi Maruti as Omana

Soundtrack
The music was composed by Shyam and the lyrics were written by Sreekumaran Thampi.

References

External links
 

1982 films
1980s Malayalam-language films
Films directed by Sreekumaran Thampi